Lancaster Inferno (NPSL) was an American men's soccer team based in Lancaster, Pennsylvania, United States. Founded in 2008, the team played in the National Premier Soccer League (NPSL), a national amateur league at the fourth tier of the American Soccer Pyramid for just one season, until 2008, when the franchise folded and the team left the league.

The team played its home games in the athletic stadium at Hempfield High School in nearby Landisville, Pennsylvania. The team's colors were orange, black, and white.

The team was part of the larger Pennsylvania Classics organization, which hosts 36 teams from the under 9 group for boys and girls, to the under 19 for young men and women and represents the South Central Pennsylvania and greater Philadelphia areas. There is also a women's team named Lancaster Inferno which plays in the Women's Premier Soccer League (WPSL).

Players

2008 roster

Year-by-year

Head coaches
 Steve Klein (2008)

Stadium
Hempfield High School; Landisville, Pennsylvania (2008)

External links
Pennsylvania Classics

2008 disestablishments in Pennsylvania
2008 establishments in Pennsylvania
Amateur soccer teams in Pennsylvania
Association football clubs disestablished in 2008
Association football clubs established in 2008
National Premier Soccer League teams
Soccer clubs in Pennsylvania
Sports in Lancaster, Pennsylvania